Elric of Melniboné is a fictional character created by English writer Michael Moorcock and the protagonist of a series of sword and sorcery stories taking place on an alternative Earth. The proper name and title of the character is Elric VIII, 428th Emperor of Melniboné. Later stories by Moorcock marked Elric as a facet of the Eternal Champion.

Elric first appeared in print in Moorcock's novella "The Dreaming City" (Science Fantasy No. 47, June 1961). Moorcock's doomed albino antihero is one of the better known characters in fantasy literature, having crossed over into a wide variety of media, such as role-playing games, comics, music, and film. The stories have been continuously in print since the 1970s.

Description
Elric is described in 1972's Elric of Melniboné:

Elric is the last emperor of the stagnating island civilization of Melniboné. Physically weak, the anemic Elric must use drugs (special herbs) to maintain his health and vitality. From childhood, he read freely in the immense royal library and learned of the world outside the Dreaming Isle. Perhaps due to this in-depth study, unlike other members of his race, Elric has a conscience. He witnesses the decadence of his culture, which once ruled the known world, and worries about the rise of the Young Kingdoms populated by humans (Melnibonéans consider themselves separate from humanity), along with the threat they pose to his empire. Because of Elric's introspective self-loathing and hatred of Melnibonéan traditions, his subjects find him odd and unfathomable. However, his cousin Yyrkoon (next in the line of succession, as Elric has no heirs) interprets this behaviour as weakness and plots Elric's death. Complicating matters is Yyrkoon's sister Cymoril, who is deeply in love with Elric; Yyrkoon covets her, and part of his plan for usurpation is to marry Cymoril himself.

In addition to his skill with herbs, Elric is an accomplished sorcerer and summoner. As emperor of Melniboné, Elric is able to call for aid upon the traditional patron of the Melniboné emperors, Arioch, a Lord of Chaos and Duke of Hell. From the first story, Elric uses ancient pacts and agreements with not only Arioch, but various other beings—some gods, some demons—to help him accomplish his tasks.

Elric's discovery of the sword Stormbringer serves as both his greatest asset and disadvantage. The sword confers upon Elric strength, health, and fighting prowess, allowing him to do away with his dependence on drugs, but it must be fed by the souls of intelligent beings. In the end, the blade takes everyone close to Elric and eventually Elric's own soul as well. Most of Moorcock's stories about Elric feature this relationship with Stormbringer, and how it—despite Elric's best intentions—brings doom to everything he holds dear.

Setting

Melniboné, also known as the Dragon Isle, is an imaginary country, an island among the Young Kingdoms.

Centuries before Elric's birth, Melniboné ruled its world through sorcerous might and sheer power. By the time of Elric's birth, it has slipped from its preeminent place, being one of many nations. The Melnibonéans are not wholly human. They are skilled with magic and beautiful, though psychologically similar to cats, with a callous nature. They are bound by many ancient customs.

Melniboné's capital and only surviving city is Imrryr, known as The Dreaming City. Most of the rest of the island has been allowed to revert to wilderness. Caverns exist below the island, in which dragons sleep, awaiting the Melnibonéans' summons to war.

Influences
Moorcock acknowledges the work of Bertolt Brecht, particularly Threepenny Novel and The Threepenny Opera, as "one of the chief influences" on the initial Elric sequence; he dedicated 1972's Elric of Melniboné to Brecht. In the same dedication, he cited Poul Anderson's Three Hearts and Three Lions and Fletcher Pratt's The Well of the Unicorn as similarly influential texts. Moorcock has referred to Elric as a type of the "doomed hero", one of the oldest character-types in literature, akin to such hero-villains as Mervyn Peake's Steerpike in the Titus Groan trilogy, Poul Anderson's Scafloc in The Broken Sword, T. H. White's Lancelot in The Once and Future King, J. R. R. Tolkien's cursed hero Túrin Turambar, and Jane Gaskell's Zerd in The Serpent.

The story of Kullervo from Finnish mythology contains elements similar to Elric's story, such as a talking magic sword and fatal alienation of the hero from his family. Besides Elric, Kullervo has been proposed as having influence on Poul Anderson's 1954 novel The Broken Sword, and J.R.R. Tolkien's Túrin Turambar. Moorcock has stated that "Anderson's a definite influence [on Elric], as stated. But oddly, the Kalevala was read to us at my boarding school when I was about seven", and "from a very early age I was reading Norse legends and any books I could find about Norse stories". Moorcock in the same posting stated that "one thing I'm pretty sure of, I was not in any way directly influenced by Prof. T[olkien]".

Elric's albinism appears influenced by Monsieur Zenith, an albino Sexton Blake villain whom Moorcock appreciated enough to write into later multiverse stories. Moorcock read Zenith stories in his youth and has contributed to their later reprinting, remarking that it "took me forty years to find another copy of Zenith the Albino! In fact it was a friend who found it under lock and key and got a copy of it to Savoy who are, at last, about to reprint it! Why I have spent so much energy making public the evidence of my vast theft from Anthony Skene, I'm not entirely sure... ". Moorcock later said: "As I've said in my introduction to Monsieur Zenith: The Albino, the Anthony Skenes character was a huge influence. For the rest of the character, his ambiguities in particular, I based him on myself at the age I was when I created Elric, which was 20". The influence of Zenith on Elric is often cited in discussions of Zenith.

Publishing history

Elric first appeared in print in a series of six novelettes published in Science Fantasy magazine:
 "The Dreaming City" (Science Fantasy No. 47, June 1961)
 "While the Gods Laugh" (Science Fantasy No. 49, October 1961)
 "The Stealer of Souls" (Science Fantasy No. 51, February 1962)
 "Kings in Darkness" (Science Fantasy No. 54, August 1962)
 "The Flame Bringers" (Science Fantasy No. 55, October 1962); retitled "The Caravan of Forgotten Dreams" in some later collections.
 "To Rescue Tanelorn ..." (Science Fantasy No. 56, December 1962)

After this came four novellas:
 "Dead God's Homecoming" (Science Fantasy No. 59, June 1963)
 "Black Sword's Brothers" (Science Fantasy No. 61, October 1963)
 "Sad Giant's Shield" (Science Fantasy No. 63, February 1964)
 "Doomed Lord's Passing" (Science Fantasy No. 64, April 1964)
The last of these terminated the sequence with the close of Elric's life.

After these initial Elric tales, Moorcock periodically published short tales throughout the 1960s and early 1970s, such as 1967's "The Singing Citadel" and 1973's "The Jade Man's Eyes". Meant to be placed in between the initial stories but before the conclusion of "Doomed Lord's Passing", these later stories would frequently be edited, retitled, and combined together with other material to form fix-ups as part of later republication campaigns.

The first original Elric novel, 1972's Elric of Melniboné, is a prequel detailing Elric's origin and how he came to possess Stormbringer. In 1989 came the second original Elric novel, The Fortress of the Pearl, followed in 1991 with The Revenge of the Rose. A decade later Moorcock began an original Elric trilogy, beginning with The Dreamthief's Daughter (2001), followed by The Skrayling Tree (2003) and The White Wolf's Son (2005). In 2022, Moorcock published The Citadel of Forgotten Myths, a new Elric novel set between "Kings in Darkness" and "The Flame Bringers".

Internal chronology 
The main sequence, according to the saga's internal chronology, comprises the following books. Bold roman numerals indicate the six-book sequence of the 1977 DAW paperbacks. The dates following each story refer to the date of original publication. In those cases where a book was assembled from several pre-existing stories, each story is given along with its original date; when an original novel is subdivided into parts, the parts are named but not given individual dates.

 (I) Elric of Melniboné (1972)
 The Fortress of the Pearl (1989) 
 "The Black Blade's Song" (1994) (AKA "The White Wolf's Song") (AKA "The Black Blade's Summoning")
 (II) The Sailor on the Seas of Fate (1976)
 Book One: "Sailing To the Future"
 Book Two: "Sailing To the Present" (revision of "The Lands Beyond the World")
 Book Three: "Sailing To the Past" (revision of "The Jade Man's Eyes")
 Elric at the End of Time (1981)
 (III) The Weird of the White Wolf
 Prologue: "The Dream of Earl Aubec" (original title: "Master of Chaos") (May 1964)
 Book One: "The Dreaming City" (June 1961)
 "A Portrait in Ivory" (2003)
 Book Two: "While the Gods Laugh" (October 1961)
 Book Three: "The Singing Citadel" (May 1967)
 (IV) The Vanishing Tower (original title: The Sleeping Sorceress) (1971)
 Book One: "The Torment of the Last Lord"
 Book Two: "To Snare the Pale Prince"
 Book Three: "Three Heroes With a Single Aim"
 The Revenge of the Rose (1991) 
 (V) The Bane of the Black Sword
 Book One: "The Stealer of Souls" (February 1962)
 Book Two: "Kings in Darkness" (August 1962)
 The Citadel of Forgotten Myths (revision of Red Pearls, Black Petals, and an unreleased novella White Steel) (2022)
 Book Three: "The Flame Bringers" (alternative title: "The Caravan of Forgotten Dreams") (October 1962)
 "The Last Enchantment" (1978) (AKA Jesting With Chaos)
 Epilogue: "To Rescue Tanelorn" (December 1962)
 (VI) Stormbringer
 Book One: "Dead God's Homecoming" (June 1963)
 Book Two: "Black Sword's Brothers" (October 1963)
 Book Three: "Sad Giant's Shield" (February 1964)
 Book Four: "Doomed Lord's Passing" (April 1964)

Chronology uncertain:
 "Elric: Return to Melniboné" (1973)
 The Dreamthief's Daughter (2001)
 The Skrayling Tree (2003)
 The White Wolf's Son (2005) (takes place while Elric is dreaming in the middle of "Doomed Lord's Passing" in Stormbringer)

Not part of canonical continuity:
 "The Jade Man's Eyes" (1973) (revised as "Sailing To the Past")
 "The Lands Beyond the World" (1977) (revised as "Sailing To the Present")
 "Black Petals" (2008) (revised as Book 2 in The Citadel of Forgotten Myths)
 "Red Pearls" (2010) (revised as Book 1 in The Citadel of Forgotten Myths)
 "White Steel" (unreleased) (revised as Book 3 in The Citadel of Forgotten Myths)

Collections 
The first five novelettes were originally collected in The Stealer of Souls (1963) and the later four novellas were first published as a novel in an edited version called Stormbringer (1965). The 1965 novel had about a quarter of the text removed for reasons of length (mostly in the second and third novellas) and the remaining text rearranged with new bridging material added to make sense of the restructuring.

In 1977, DAW Books republished Elric's saga in six books that collected the tales according to their internal chronology. These paperbacks all featured cover art work by the same artist, Michael Whelan, and helped define the look of Elric and his sword Stormbringer. The DAW edition of Stormbringer restored some of the original structure and text compared to the 1965 release, but other revisions were performed and other material excised. A few oddments were collected in Elric at the End of Time (1984), which became the seventh book in the DAW line when DAW released it in the US in 1985. It includes two Elric-related tales: the title story and 1962's "The Last Enchantment", originally intended as the final Elric story but put aside in favour of those that eventually made up Stormbringer; it was not published until 1978. Both would appear in later collections (with "The Last Enchantment" occasionally retitled "Jesting with Chaos").

In the 1990s, Orion Publishing/Millennium released a two-book collection – Elric of Melniboné and Stormbringer – containing the Elric material then available. White Wolf Publishing released a similar two-volume compilation – Elric: Song of the Black Sword (1998) and Elric: The Stealer of Souls (2001). These two-volume compilations are arranged according to the internal chronology of the saga. The White Wolf text has minor revisions when compared to the Millennium release.

The first nine short stories – with "The Flame Bringers" using the later title of "The Caravan of Forgotten Dreams" and the full text of Stormbringer as it appeared in Science Fantasy – were republished in a single volume as Elric (Orion/Gollancz 2001), volume 17 in the Fantasy Masterworks series.

Beginning in 2008, Del Rey Books reprinted the Elric material as a series of six illustrated books: The Stealer of Souls, To Rescue Tanelorn, The Sleeping Sorceress, Duke Elric, Elric in the Dream Realms, and Elric: Swords and Roses. This series arranged the stories in the sequence they were originally published, along with related fiction and nonfiction material. The version of Stormbringer featured in this collection restored all the original material missing since the 1977 DAW edition – which had formed the basis for all later editions – as well as Moorcock's preferred versions of all the revised material in an attempt to produce a definitive text. These volumes present the evolution of the character through early juvenile stories, early fanzine musings by Moorcock, some Elric stories, some others introducing the reader to the wider "Eternal Champion" theme, stories of other heroes who coexist with Elric in the realm of Melniboné, unpublished prologues, installments of Moorcock's essay "Aspects of Fantasy", a 1970s screenplay, a reader's guide, notes from an Elric series that never developed, contemporary reviews, and appreciation essays by other writers.

In August 2012, Victor Gollancz Ltd. announced their intention to republish all of Michael Moorcock's back catalogue, including all the Elric stories, presented in internal chronological order along with previously unpublished material, in both print and e-book formats. The Elric stories were published in seven volumes in 2014–15: Elric of Melniboné and Other Stories, Elric: The Fortress of the Pearl, Elric: The Sailor on the Seas of Fate, Elric: The Sleeping Sorceress, Elric: The Revenge of the Rose, Elric: Stormbringer!, and Elric: The Moonbeam Roads.

Characters in the Elric series

 Arioch: Lord of Chaos.
 Cymoril: A Melnibonéan, Elric's cousin, consort and first great love. He hopes to one day make her his wife and empress. She tries to understand and help Elric, but like his subjects, she has difficulty understanding Elric's motivations and would have him rule as the emperors of old. Despite that she stands by Elric in his weakest state before his acquiring of Stormbringer and she supports his dreams and wishes even when she is put in danger by them.
 Dyvim Slorm: A Melnibonéan, Elric's cousin, son of Dyvim Tvar. He fights alongside Elric in the final war against Chaos, wielding the black sword Mournblade.
 Dyvim Tvar: A Melnibonéan, one of Elric's few friends. He is one of the Dragon Masters, a group of Melnibonéans who can speak to the Dragons of Melniboné. Dyvim Tvar stays loyal to Elric even after he destroys Imrryr. Dyvim Tvar also has more of a moral compass than most Melnibonéans.
 Ernest Wheldrake: An amiable poet and bard who involuntarily travels across the Multiverse. Amorous and good-natured, he is given to sudden expulsions of verse and song. He is writing an epic poem about Elric during their shared adventures. 
 Jagreen Lern: The cruel ruler of Pan Tang, skilled with both magic and the use of a battleaxe.
 Moonglum of Elwher: A short, red-haired human with a cheerfully ugly face, adventuring companion to Elric. He and Elric share many dangers and rewards together. The most steadfast and loyal companion of all the Young Kingdom humans Elric encounters. He helps Elric in completing his fated purpose.
 Myshella of Law: Colloquially referred to as the Empress of the Dawn and The Dark Lady of Kaneloon, the powerful sorceress Myshella has acted as a guide and consort to Eternal Champions and adventurers alike down through the ages in the ineffable pursuit of Law. Immortal, ageless, and indescribably powerful. She sometimes rides a metal bird with emerald eyes, and more than once lends this mount to Elric. 
 Oone: A Dreamthief by trade, at the Silver Flower Oasis in the Sighing Desert, Lady Oone helps Elric locate The Fortress of the Pearl when another of her order dies in a previous attempt. Her fleeting romance with the albino has considerable significance during the later 'Moonbeam Roads' trilogy. 
 Prince Gaynor The Damned: A fallen knight of the Balance, doomed to suffer without release by the forces of Chaos. He inhabits a formless existence, imprisoned in a black-and-gold suit of armor emblazoned with the 8-pointed symbol of Chaos. 
 Rackhir, the Red Archer: A human, once a Warrior Priest of Phum but cast out of his order. He and Elric travel and adventure together several times throughout the series. Unlike other characters who serve either Law or Chaos, Rackhir devotes himself to the Balance exclusively. 
 Sepiriz: One of the ten remaining Nihrain, this dark-skinned servant of the Balance guides Elric through the final phases of his quest. He is also sometimes called 'The Knight in Black and Yellow'.
 Shaarilla of Myyrrhn: The daughter of a dead necromancer, Shaarilla of the Dancing Mist was born a mutant and an outcast among her people. Unlike her fellows of Myyrrhn, Shaarilla was born without wings. She enlists Elric to locate The Dead Gods' Book in the hopes it might contain a spell to reverse her deformity. 
 Smiorgan Baldhead: A Count of the Isle of the Purple Towns, and an affable adventurer who accompanies Elric on his adventures on the Nameless Continent. His fleets aid in the Sacking of Imrryr. 
 Theleb K'aarna: A human sorcerer of the Pan Tang isles. After being displaced as Queen Yishana's advisor and chief sorcerer by Elric, he seeks revenge and uses sorcery to hinder several of Elric's plans.
 The Rose: A beautiful, scarlet-haired warrior Elric encounters on his journeys through the Multiverse. She wields a Lawful counterpart to Elric's Chaos-forged demonblade 'Stormbringer' named 'Swift Thorn'. Serving neither Law nor Chaos, she has sworn an oath of revenge against Gaynor The Damned for the eradication of a universe that was precious to her. 
 Yishana of Jharkor: A human, ruler of Jharkor. She presents Elric with several problems/adventures and openly covets his company and power. Her selfish desires are the root of several of Elric's problems, but she also aids him from time to time and ultimately becomes an important ally in his fight against Chaos.
 Yyrkoon: Prince of Melniboné, Elric's cousin. He is next in line for the throne, as Elric has no male heir. He worries about Elric's behaviour and takes all of Elric's brooding and philosophical talk as a sign of weakness. He yearns for a return to more traditional emperors and secretly plots Elric's demise. Yyrkoon is a great sorcerer who has made many pacts with unholy forces to obtain his sorcerous strength. As further evidence of his decadent ways, he openly desires his sister Cymoril and intends to make her his wife and Empress if his plans ever reach fruition.
 Zarozinia: A human of the Young Kingdoms. She falls in love with Elric and eventually marries him, for a time allowing him to experience true love and companionship. For her sake, Elric also gives up his blade Stormbringer and reverts to taking sorcerous herbs to sustain his life.

Appearances in other media

Comics 

 In 1968, the French artist Philippe Druillet drew the first comics version of Elric in Spirits #1, written by Michel Demuth, which was published as a book the same year. 
 In the early 70s James Cawthorn published his oversized  graphic novel Stormbringer with Savoy Books. 
 Elric first appeared in large-circulation comics in America in Conan the Barbarian issues 14–15 (1972), in an adventure in two parts entitled "A Sword Called Stormbringer!" and "The Green Empress of Melniboné". The comic was written by Roy Thomas  and illustrated by Barry Windsor-Smith, based on a story plotted by Michael Moorcock and James Cawthorn.
 Star Reach comics published Elric stories in the late 1970s. First Comics published several Elric mini-series in the 1980s as well.
 P. Craig Russell has drawn comics adaptations of three Moorcock novels: Elric of Melniboné (with Roy Thomas and Michael T. Gilbert; Pacific Comics), The Dreaming City and While the Gods Laugh (representing the first two-thirds of Weird of the White Wolf; Marvel/Epic Comics), and Stormbringer (Dark Horse). The character has also been adapted by Walter Simonson, Frank Brunner, George Freeman, and others in the long-running Elric series at Pacific which Russell had co-created (reportedly tensions between him and Thomas were the reason for his departure).
 Elric also appeared in a number of original stories published by DC Comics. Helix, a short-lived science-fiction and fantasy imprint of DC, published the 12-issue Michael Moorcock's Multiverse from 1997. In 2004, DC Comics published the four-issue Elric: Making of a Sorcerer, with art by Walter Simonson, a story about Elric's magical training before the events of the novel Elric of Melniboné.
 2011 marked the launch of another Elric-based comic, Elric: The Balance Lost by BOOM! Studios. The series, written by Chris Roberson and drawn by Francesco Biagini, is available in both traditional hard copy and for digital download.
 In 2014, The Ruby Throne, the first volume of a new four-volume adaptation of Elric of Melniboné written by Julien Blondel and illustrated by Didier Poli, Jean Bastide, and Robin Recht, was published by Glenat in France and titan in UK. Stormbringer, the second volume was published in March 2015 by the same team and publisher.   The third volume, entitled The White Wolf, was released in September 2017. The final volume, The Dreaming City, was released in August 2021.

Music
 The Chronicle of the Black Sword is a 1985 album by UK space rock band Hawkwind. Moorcock and Hawkwind had, at this stage, collaborated a number of times. An expanded live album, Live Chronicles, was released in 1986. This included several spoken-word interludes by author Moorcock in his capacity as on-stage narrator. The live show also included a mime artist portraying Elric himself. A video concert film entitled The Chronicle of the Black Sword appeared on VHS and later on DVD.
 The song "Black Blade" was recorded for the album Cultösaurus Erectus (1980) by Blue Öyster Cult, written by singer/guitarist Eric Bloom with lyrics by Moorcock. Moorcock also collaborated on the songs "The Great Sun Jester" (Mirrors (1979)) and "Veteran of the Psychic Wars" (Fire of Unknown Origin (1981)).
 The heavy metal band Tygers of Pan Tang take their name from the fictional islands of Pan Tang in the Elric series, where the ruling wizards keep pet tigers.
 The UK space rock (later heavy metal) band Mournblade take their name from the sister-sword of Elric's blade Stormbringer.
New wave of British heavy metal band Diamond Head made Elric one of the primary lyrical subjects of their 1982 release Borrowed Time and featured the character on the cover art. Songs from this release were re-recorded by Metallica.

Film
 Wendy Pini published a book documenting her attempt to make an animated film project of the Stormbringer series, Law and Chaos: The "Stormbringer" Animated Film Project.
 In May 2007, in an interview with Empire magazine, directors Chris and Paul Weitz stated that they were in the process of adapting a trilogy of films based on Elric for Universal Pictures. Chris grew up reading the material and has met with Moorcock, who trusted them with the project. Universal dropped the project and it is now in the hands of New Republic Pictures.

Television 
 In November 2019, New Republic announced the development of a television series based on the Elric novels, to be adapted by Glen Mazzara and Vaun Wilmott.

Role-playing games
 Elric (along with Stormbringer) was listed in the first printing of Advanced Dungeons & Dragons (AD&D) Deities & Demigods rule book. However, Chaosium already had a role playing series in the works based on Elric and Stormbringer, and the initial AD&D printing was not fully authorised. A mutually beneficial deal was worked out between Chaosium and TSR, yet TSR chose to remove Elric from later printings of Deities & Demigods.
 The world of Elric's Young Kingdoms was the setting of the Stormbringer role-playing game by the publisher Chaosium (Hawkmoon has also been so treated, as has Corum). In 1993 Chaosium released Elric! which still used their BRP system.
 After a disagreement between Moorcock and Chaosium, the Stormbringer line was discontinued. Subsequently, a new version called "Elric of Melniboné" was published by Mongoose Publishing under their Runequest system in 2007.

Video game
A video game based on Elric was in development by Haiku Studios and to be published by Psygnosis for the PlayStation during the late 1990s.

Critical response 
Writing for NPR, Jason Sheehan calls Elric "far and away the coolest, grimmest, moodiest, most elegant, degenerate, drug-addicted, cursed, twisted and emotionally weird mass murderer of them all".

References in popular culture

Footnotes

External links
Moorcock's Miscellany (formerly Tanelorn, Multiverse.org & Moorcock's Weekly Miscellany)
Michael Moorcock's Comics Compendium incl. Elric adaptations
Stormbringer.net, a source of summaries of the novels

Eternal Champion (character)
Michael Moorcock characters
Novels by Michael Moorcock
Michael Moorcock's Multiverse
Fantasy books by series
Fictional characters with albinism
Fictional emperors and empresses
Fictional mercenaries
Fictional swordfighters
Fictional wizards
Fictional characters who use magic
Characters in fantasy literature
Dark fantasy
Literary characters introduced in 1961
Characters in American novels of the 20th century
Sword and sorcery